Pseudovertagus aluco, common name aluco vertagus or Cuming's cerith, is a species of sea snail, a marine gastropod mollusk in the family Cerithiidae, the ceriths.

Distribution
This species is present in the Indo-Pacific from the Eastern Africa to Philippines, and in Australia (Northern Territory, Queensland and Western Australia), the Samoan Islands and New Caledonia.

Habitat
Pseudovertagus aluco can be found on sand-bars at the high tide level, on tidalflats, on clean sand and coralrubble.

Description
This species possess high-spired shells with a small aperture and a few spiral rows of tubercles.

Behaviour
These sea snails usually extend their proboscis and foot deep into the sediments, rather than burrowing below the surface.

References

  Linnaeus, C. 1758. Systemae naturae per regna tria naturae, secundum classes, ordines, genera, species, cum characteribus, differetiis, synonymis, locis.v. Holmiae : Laurentii Salvii 824 pp.
 Born, I. von 1778. Index rerum naturalium Musei Caesarei Vindobonensis, pl. 1, Testacea. – Verzeichniss etc. Illust. Vindobonae. Vienna : J.P. Krauss xlii 458 pp.
 Bruguière, M. 1792. Encyclopédie Méthodique ou par ordre de matières. Histoire naturelle des vers. Paris : Panckoucke Vol. 1 i–xviii, 757 pp. 
 Adams, H. & Adams, A. 1854. The genera of Recent Mollusca arranged according to their organization. London : John Van Voorst Vol. 1(IX-XV) pp. 257–484, pls 33–60.
 Sowerby, G.B. 1855. Thesaurus Conchyliorum, or monographs of genera of shells. London : Sowerby Vol. 2(16) 847–899, pls 176–186.
 Kobelt, W. 1898. Die Gattung Cerithium Lam. 201–297, pls 37–47 in Küster, H.C., Martini, F.W. & Chemnitz, J.H. (eds). Systematisches Conchylien-Cabinet von Martini und Chemnitz. Nürnberg : Bauer & Raspe Vol. 1. 
 Thiele, J. 1931. Handbuch der Systematischen Weichtierkunde. Jena : Gustav Fischer Vol. 2 pp. 377–778. 
 Hirase, S. & Taki, I. 1951. A handbook of illustrated shells in natural colors from the Japanese Islands and adjacent territories. Tokyo : Bunkyokaku xxiv, 134 pp. 
 Wilson, B.R. & Gillett, K. 1971. Australian Shells: illustrating and describing 600 species of marine gastropods found in Australian waters. Sydney : Reed Books 168 pp. 
 Cernohorsky, W.O. 1972. The taxonomy of some Indo-Pacific Mollusca with descriptions of new species. Records of the Auckland Institute and Museum 9: 195–204 
 Houbrick, R.S. 1978. The family Cerithiidae in the Indo-Pacific. Part I. The genera Rhinoclavis, Pseudovertagus and Clavocerithium. Monographs of Marine Mollusca 1: 1–130 
 Wilson, B. 1993. Australian Marine Shells. Prosobranch Gastropods. Kallaroo, Western Australia : Odyssey Publishing Vol. 1 408 pp.

External links
 CERITHIIDAE
 Shell Encyclopedia

Bibliography
 Dautzenberg, Ph. (1929). Contribution à l'étude de la faune de Madagascar: Mollusca marina testacea. Faune des colonies françaises, III(fasc. 4). Société d'Editions géographiques, maritimes et coloniales: Paris. 321–636, plates IV-VII pp.
 Petit R.E. (2009) George Brettingham Sowerby, I, II & III: their conchological publications and molluscan taxa. Zootaxa 2189: 1–218.

Cerithiidae
Gastropods described in 1758
Taxa named by Carl Linnaeus